The Mehmet Aga Mosque (from ) is a historical Ottoman-era mosque on the Aegean island of Rhodes, Greece. Built in the early nineteenth century, it is not open for worship like most of the other mosques on the island. It stands on a prominent place on Sokratous street in the commercial center of the medieval town of Rhodes.

History 
Mehmet Aga Mosque has gone through several phases of development throughout its existence, whether in respect of its architectural, ornamental, inscriptional elements or others. It was built on the site of an older, ruined mosque in 1819, and it was extensively remodeled in 1875 following the earthquake of 1856. It was heavily damaged during World War II, and subsequently restorations were carried out in 1948. In the 1970s, the minaret and the balcony, which were in poor condition, were removed. The 2004 renovation notably included the reconstruction of these two elements.

It is considered to be the most popular Ottoman mosque in Rhodes, due to its features and distinguishing look.

Architecture 
The mosque belongs to a Bursa I type of building, composing of a square or rectangular area, and the interior covered with a mosque. The Mehmet Aga, however, does not have a dome but rather a wooden gable roof. The mihrab is located in the middle of the qibla wall, a semicircular niche with a diameter of about one meter crowned with a trefoil arch. The outer windows are topped with a row of pointed arched rectangular openings. The walls are built with red tuff stoned, and have all been re-used in the building. It would appear that the ground flood of the mosque was constructed on the ruins of an old structure the Knights Hospitaller built, and was not originally a mosque.

It was built with an orientation towards Mecca (thus in rotation with respect to the ground floor), resulting in the need of a support column on the street to built.

Its current minaret is made out of wood. Nothing remains of the old one, as it was completely renewed by the Greek Ministry of Culture. Its polygonal shape, unlike that of other pencil-like Ottoman minarets, bespeaks of its Arabic influence.

The fountain on the yard was added during the second building period in 1875, and served two functions; the first, as a prayers ablutions prior to the praying, the second as the jeshma the people in the street had drank from. The fountain is a wall divided into three horizontal parts, separated with four stone pillars; the marble panels are decorated with geometrical ornaments in the shape of a pointed arch.

See also 

 Islam in Greece
 List of former mosques in Greece
 List of mosques in Greece
 Ibrahim Pasha Mosque, Rhodes

References

Bibliography

External links 
 

Buildings and structures in Rhodes (city)
Ottoman mosques in Greece
Former mosques in Greece
19th-century mosques
19th-century architecture in Greece
Mosques completed in 1819
Ottoman architecture in Rhodes